Santa Rosa (Valle Viejo) is a municipality in Catamarca Province in northwestern Argentina. It is located within the Greater San Fernando del Valle de Catamarca area.

References

Populated places in Catamarca Province